Metzia formosae is a species of cyprinid in the genus Metzia. It is considered "least concern" by the IUCN Red List. It inhabits small rivers in still or slow-moving waters and can be found in Yunnan, China and Taiwan.

References

Cyprinidae
Cyprinid fish of Asia
Freshwater fish of China
Freshwater fish of Taiwan
IUCN Red List least concern species